The United States Nordic Combined Championships 2013 took place on August 3 & 6, 2012 in Park City, Utah. Todd Lodwick won the race.

Results

References 
 Tha Park City Nordic Ski Club website.
 The results.

2013 in Nordic combined
2013 in American sports
United States Nordic Combined Championships